Dr. Ahamed is medical doctor turned bureaucrat who joined the Indian Administrative Service in 2005. As of May 2021, he is currently serving as the Mission Director of National Health Mission Tamil Nadu. He was honoured by Prime Minister for Excellence in Public Administration for the year 2012–13.

Education 
Ahamed was born on 2 February 1977 in Manjeri, Kerala. He graduated in medicine at Kasturba Medical College, Mangalore and in 2005 joined in Indian Administrative Service. On being awarded with Chevening scholarship, he took study leave from September 2019 to September 2020 & did his Master of Science in Health Policy Planning and Financing at London School of Economics & London School of Hygiene & Tropical Medicine.

Career
Ahamed got trained as Assistant Collector under Collector T. Udhayachandran in Madurai District. During his training, he was keenly involved in the conduct of Panchayat elections as Pappapatti and other villages,  and contributed as a case study on good governance.

He served as Sub-Collector in Devakottai Sub-division of Sivaganga District, Additional Collector (Development) in Madurai and Krishnagiri Districts, Joint Commissioner (Commercial Taxes) - Chennai North Division, and Deputy Commissioner (Works) of Chennai Corporation. In 2011 he became District Collector of Perambalur district He took a number of initiatives to develop Perambalur District, which had been having a low and declining per capita income. Later he served as the Mission Director of the National Health Mission Tamil Nadu.

Achievements
Government of India nominated him to undergo special training in Urban Management the Lee Kuan Yew School of Public Policy, National University of Singapore. He was awarded the Indian Prime Minister’s Awards for Excellence in Public Administration for the year 2012-13 presented by Prime Minister Shri Narendra Modi on the National Civil Services Day, 21 April 2015 for his work in combating female infanticide and improving sex ratio at birth.  His bold initiatives to combat child marriage brought on him the wrath of some Islamic groups. The children went on to continue their studies and performed well in the board exams.

Earlier, his services had been recognized by the Government of Tamil Nadu with awards conferred by the then Chief Minister Selvi J.Jayalalithaa during the Collectors' Conferences 2012 and 2013  for Efficient Disposal of Chief Minister's Special Cell Petitions, and best performing Collector in the health sector (2012), and e-governance, and special initiatives for the differently-abled (2013) respectively.

He was recognized as a fearless and fair officer by The Telegraph for his recruitment for government posts in 2012. He was also shortlisted for the Award by the Election Commission of India for best practices in conduct of the Parliamentary Elections, 2014.

See also 
 Neeraj Mittal
 Civil Services of India

References

Indian Administrative Service officers
Government of Tamil Nadu
Living people
1977 births
District magistrate